The Rubbernose conger (Macrocephenchelys brevirostris) is an eel in the family Congridae (conger/garden eels). It was described by Johnson T. F. Chen and Herman Ting-Chen Weng in 1967, originally under the genus Rhynchoconger. It is a marine, tropical eel which is known from the western Pacific Ocean, including Taiwan and Australia.

References

Congridae
Fish described in 1967